Skirt! is a monthly women's magazine published in Charleston, South Carolina. It was founded in 1994.

History
skirt! was founded in 1994 by Nikki Hardin, a freelance writer living off the coast of Charleston, South Carolina.  Longing to have something to read that reflected her life and the lives of the women she knew, she decided to start a magazine.

Hardin began skirt! with $400 and the support of her friends.  She had no business plan, no collateral, and no experience in the magazine industry. She wanted a publication that had essays on women's issues, not recipes and fashion.  A publication that spoke to all sides of a woman's personality.  

In 2003, Hardin sold skirt! to Morris Communications in Augusta, Georgia.  She remained as publisher.

Hardin started skirt! books, an imprint of the Morris Communications' Globe Pequot Press. It publishes only women's non-fiction books, such as:

References

External links
 skirt.com
 skirt! Books

1994 establishments in South Carolina
Magazines established in 1994
Magazines published in Georgia (U.S. state)
Magazines published in South Carolina
Mass media in Augusta, Georgia
Mass media in Charleston, South Carolina
Women's magazines published in the United States